Santa Maria di Nazareth (translated into Saint Mary of Nazareth) is the name of at least two churches in Italy:
Santa Maria di Nazareth (Venice)
Basilica di Santa Maria di Nazareth, Sestri Levante

Titles of Mary